Route 100 is a state highway in Connecticut that connects the town center of East Haven with the Foxon community in the northern part of town.

Route description 
Route 100 lies wholly within the town of East Haven. It begins at US 1 in the eastern part of town and heads west through the town center along Main Street before turning north along North High Street. It crosses over US 1 without a direct connection and intersects I-95 at exit 52 before continuing north to end at Route 80 in the Foxon section of town. The interchange with I-95 is a partial one and allows direct access to northbound and from southbound I-95 only. Traffic heading for southbound I-95 is directed to use Kimberly Avenue, which connects to US 1. This portion of Kimberly Avenue is an unsigned state road with designation State Road 735.

History 
Modern Route 100 was established in 1935, running approximately from the current location of the intersection of US 1 and the Amtrak railroad to Route 80. Since then, the southern terminus has been moved several times. In 1943, it was extended south along Thompson Avenue (formers SR 558) to the entrance of Tweed-New Haven Airport. In 1962, the southern end of Route 100 was relocated, taking over part of Route 142 to Silver Sands Road, ending at a reconfigured Route 142, which was changed to continue west along Silver Sands Road and modern Route 337. This configuration was reversed in 1969, as the section of Route 100 south of Main Street was reassigned back to Route 142. The south end was shifted further east in 1993 to end at US 1 near the Branford town line.

Junction list

References

External links

100
Transportation in New Haven County, Connecticut
East Haven, Connecticut